Global Underground 016: Dave Seaman, Cape Town is a DJ mix album in the Global Underground series, compiled and mixed by Dave Seaman. The mix is a retrospective look at a set in Cape Town, South Africa.

Dave Seaman makes a welcome return to GU a year after his debut release. This CD was the first and only (so far...) visit the series has paid to the African continent, as Dave showcases the tracks he used to whip South Africa's growing club scene into a suitable frenzy.

The party in Cape Town was particularly memorable, not only because it was Dave's birthday on the night of the event, but also because a bomb scare caused the evacuation of the entire area in the middle of his set. The clubbers didn't let this unwelcome break in the proceedings spoil the party though, singing a mass 'happy birthday' to Dave outside, before being let back inside to blow the roof off in a more acceptable, safely metaphorical manner.

Track listing

Disc one
 Sound 5 - "The Hacienda Must Be (Re:)Built" – 1:43
 Rui da Silva - "The Four Elements 'Earth'" – 2:46
 Simon Pearson - "Free at Last" – 3:28
 Moby - "Porcelain (Futureshock Instrumental)" – 6:54
 Ian Wilkie - "Guten Morgen" – 5:29
 Mandalay - "Deep Love (Charlie May Remix)" – 1:55
 The Ananda Project - "Cascades of Colour" – 5:23
 Inertia - "Vellum" – 4:49
 Gloat - "Wuarp" – 5:50
 Brothers Love Dubs - "1-800 Ming" – 6:42
 Muse - "Sunburn (Timo Maas Remix)" – 5:06
 Above - "New Day Dawning" – 8:12
 Breeder - "Tyrantanic (Slacker's Kingdom Come Mix)" – 6:14

Disc two
 Pete Lazonby - "Sacred Cycles (Quivver Mix)" – 7:19
 Planisphere - "So Many Ways" – 8:46
 Luzon - "The Baguio Track (Bedrock Remix)" – 8:14
 Bleachin' - "Peakin' (Jimmy Van M's CPR Remix)" – 1:50
 Ballroom - "4AM" – 4:50
 Opal - "The Snake" – 6:56
 Nerva - "Modo VII" – 7:09
 Way Out West - "The Fall" – 5:39
 James Holden - "Horizons (Way Out West Remix)" – 6:08
 Junkie XL - "Zerotonine (Slacker Tens Remix)" – 8:04
 Highland - "No Way Out" – 7:16

References

External links 

Global Underground
DJ mix albums